Christopher Arthur Greet (12 June 1932 – 28 December 2020) was an actor and radio presenter. He is best known for his work alongside Victoria Wood in the 1998 BBC comedy series dinnerladies.

Early life
Greet was born in Ceylon in 1932.

Career
Greet presented radio programmes with Radio Ceylon, the oldest radio station in South Asia. He later became an actor. One of his earliest roles was as a British officer in the wartime epic film The Bridge on the River Kwai with Sir Alec Guinness, which was filmed in Ceylon. He also appeared in several plays in Colombo alongside great Ceylonese actors such as Lucien de Zoysa.

His final acting credit was in the 2010 action film, Prince of Persia: The Sands of Time.

Filmography

Personal life and death
Greet lived in London. He played an active role with the Sri Lanka Christian Association in the United Kingdom. Greet died in December 2020.

See also
Vernon Corea
 SLBC-creating new waves of history
Eighty Years of Broadcasting in Sri Lanka

References

External links

Sri Lanka Broadcasting Corporation

Sri Lankan radio personalities
Sri Lankan Christians
2020 deaths
1932 births